The three of hearts is a playing card in the standard 52-card deck.

Three of Hearts may also refer to:

 3 of Hearts, an American country music trio
 3 of Hearts (album), a 2001 country pop album
 Three of Hearts: A Postmodern Family, a 2004 documentary film
 Three of Hearts (1993 film), a 1993 sex comedy film

See also

 or 

 Two of Hearts (disambiguation)
 Six of Hearts (disambiguation)
 Jack of Hearts (disambiguation)
 Queen of Hearts (disambiguation)
 King of Hearts (disambiguation)
 Ace of Hearts (disambiguation)
 Three Hearts (disambiguation)